Granny's Garden is an educational adventure game for the British BBC Micro computer, released in 1983. It served as a first introduction to computers for many schoolchildren in the United Kingdom during the 1980s and 1990s. According to the 4Mation webpage about the original version, it was the reason many teachers decided that computers had a real place in education. The software is still available in its original and updated  formats.

Created by Mike Matson for 4Mation, the game takes place in the Kingdom of the Mountains. The aim is to find the six missing children of the King and Queen, while avoiding the evil witch, by solving puzzles.

References

External links
 Granny's Garden
 Retro Granny's Garden
 
 

1983 video games
Acorn Archimedes games
Amiga games
Amstrad CPC games
BBC Micro and Acorn Electron games
Children's educational video games
Commodore 64 games
IOS games
Classic Mac OS games
MacOS games
Video games developed in the United Kingdom
Windows games
Video games about witchcraft
ZX Spectrum games